Grigore IV Ghica or Grigore Dimitrie Ghica (June 30, 1755 – April 29, 1834) was Prince of Wallachia between 1822 and 1828. A member of the Ghica family, Grigore IV was the brother of Alexandru II Ghica and the uncle of Dora d'Istria.

While many of his relatives had occupied the throne in both Wallachia and Moldavia as Phanariotes, the regime change after the Greek War of Independence, Tudor Vladimirescu's 1821 uprising and the Philikí Etaireía's brief rule in the two Danubian Principalities, led to Grigore IV being considered the first in a succession of non-Phanariote rulers. The elections for Prince in the Divan, although prescribed by the Akkerman Convention of 1826, were not to be organized, due mainly to precipitating events. As a Prince, Grigore watched after the development of agriculture in his region. He also assisted in the development of a national Romanian literature.

The Prince was ousted by the Russian occupation (see Russo-Turkish War, 1828–1829).

Grigore IV Ghica was first married to Maria Hangerly or Chantzeres (relative of Ecumenical Patriarch Samuel I Chatzeres), with whom he had six sons (Costache, Iorgu, Scarlat, Grigore, Panait, and Dimitrie), and then to Eufrosina Săvescu, with whom he had two daughters (Maria and Alexandrina).

Ancestry

References

 

Rulers of Wallachia
Grigore IV
1755 births
1834 deaths